() is a two-piece garment set of attire which was designed to look like a style of traditional Chinese wedding dress and follows the traditional Chinese  clothing system. It was developed in modern China and became popular in 2001 when it was popularized by when Zhou Xun, the actress who played the role of Xiu He, in the Chinese television drama 《》(), thus gaining its contemporary name from name of the television drama character. It is often confused with another traditional Chinese wedding dress known as  due to their similarities in appearance.

Origins 

In 2001, the prototype of the modern  was a  wedding dress costume which was designed by costume designer Ye Jintian for the role of drama female character Xiu He, played by Chinese actress Zhou Xun, in the 2002 Chinese television drama 《》, also known as Ripening Orange in English, a drama set in the Republican era of China. While basing himself on the clothing of the Qing dynasty, Ye Jintian, however, did not fully respected the historical accuracy of the dress and instead mixed several elements together from similar eras in his costume design.

As it gives a feeling of dignity and beauty, the  designed by Ye Jintian became progressively popular and eventually became a form of wedding dress chosen by brides during their marriage. It especially became popular among several Chinese female celebrities.

Construction and design 

The sleeves are horn sleeves, which are relatively wide; the sleeves can sometimes be double-layered.

This wedding skirt is also called . The  used in the  can either be an A-line, pleated skirt or a pleated circle skirt. The skirt is long enough to touch the top of its wearer's feet.

Embroidery 

The  is typically embroidered with flowers (e.g. peonies) and birds (e.g. peacocks) to symbolize love for whole seasons. It can also be embroidered with pairs of butterflies, and auspicious Chinese characters.

Related content 

 Hanfu
 Ruqun
 Mamianqun
 Guzhuang

See also 

 Traditional Chinese wedding dress
 Traditional Chinese marriage

Gallery

References 

Chinese traditional clothing
Marriage in Chinese culture
Wedding dresses
Embroidery